Harshaw is a surname of Northern Irish origin. Notable people with the surname include:

Henry B. Harshaw (1842–1900), American politician
Margaret Harshaw (1909–1997), American opera singer and voice teacher

References

Surnames of Irish origin